Divij Sharan and Igor Zelenay were the defending champions, but both players chose not to participate. Sharan is instead participating at the Cologne tournament and Zelenay at the Sardinia tournament.

Jürgen Melzer and Édouard Roger-Vasselin won the title, defeating Marcelo Demoliner and Matwé Middelkoop in the final, 6–2, 7–6(7–4).

Seeds

Draw

Draw

Qualifying

Seeds

Qualifiers
  Evgeny Donskoy /  Roman Safiullin

Lucky losers
  James Duckworth /  Ilya Ivashka

Qualifying draw

References

External Links
Main Draw

St. Petersburg Open - Doubles
2020 Doubles